Elachista elksourensis is a moth of the family Elachistidae. It is found in the Atlas Mountains in Tunisia.

The forewings are white, irregularly irrorated with black-tipped scales especially in median and distal area. The hindwings are grey with an ochreous white fringe.

References

elksourensis
Moths described in 2005
Endemic fauna of Tunisia
Moths of Africa